The Loxahatchee River (Seminole for river of turtles) is a 7.6 mile river near the southeast coast of Florida. It is a National Wild and Scenic River, one of only two in the state, and received its federal designation on May 17, 1985.  The source of the Loxahatchee River is in Riverbend Park on the south side of Indiantown Road about 1.5 miles west of I-95 and Florida's Turnpike in Jupiter, Florida. The Loxahatchee River flows out of the Jupiter Inlet and into the Atlantic Ocean. This river was the inspiration for Florida film producer Elam Stoltzfus' 2005 project Our Signature: the Wild and Scenic Loxahatchee River, a film done in conjunction with the Loxahatchee River Preservation Initiative.

Launching points for canoe and kayak trips on the river are accessible at Riverbend Park and at Jonathan Dickinson State Park  The 1930s pioneer homestead of Trapper Nelson lies along the river in a section that runs through Jonathan Dickinson State Park.

See also 
 List of Florida rivers

References

External links 
 Loxahatchee River District
 Loxahatchee River Canoe Trail
 Official Guide to the Loxahatchee River
 Loxahatchee River - Lake Worth Creek Aquatic Preserve
 NW Fork of the Loxahatchee River & Tributaries
 Boating on the Loxahatchee River
 Loxahatchee River Watershed - Florida DEP

Rivers of Florida
Wild and Scenic Rivers of the United States
Bodies of water of Palm Beach County, Florida
Bodies of water of Martin County, Florida